Parris Renee Goebel , also known professionally as Parris, is an Emmy Award winning New Zealand Choreographer, Dancer, Singer, Director and Actress. She is the Founder and main Choreographer of the Dance School, “The Palace Dance Studio", which has produced Dance Crews such as ReQuest, Sorority, Bubblegum, and The Royal Family. The latter has won the World Hip Hop Dance Championship three times in a row, becoming the first Dance Crew in history to achieve it.

She has worked alongside multiple mainstream artists including Rihanna, Jennifer Lopez, Normani; and has choreographed the music videos for "What Do You Mean?" and "Yummy" by Justin Bieber, "Touch" by Little Mix, "Level Up" by Ciara, and "How Do You Sleep?" by Sam Smith.

Goebel was nominated for the MTV Video Music Award for Video of the Year as a Director on "Sorry" by Justin Bieber. She has also earned three Primetime Emmy Award nominations for her choreography work on the Amazon Prime Video television specials Savage X Fenty Show, Savage X Fenty Show: Vol. 2, and Savage X Fenty: Vol. 3 by Rihanna, and won the Primetime Emmy Award for Outstanding Choreography for the latter.

Early life 
Goebel is of Samoan, Chinese, and Scottish descent, and grew up in South Auckland. She was interested in dance from a young age and started hip-hop dance lessons when she was 10. When she was 15, she started the dance group ReQuest with four friends. Initially they practiced in Goebel's aunt's garage and later at her father's warehouse. After a year working together, they went to the Monsters of Hip Hop Dance Convention in the United States and Goebel was selected to dance in the finale performance of the convention.

Following the convention, Goebel left Auckland Girls' Grammar School to concentrate on her dancing.

Career 
Goebel has worked with artists including Ciara, Ariana Grande, Little Mix, Justin Bieber, Rihanna, Janet Jackson, Jennifer Lopez, Nicki Minaj, Big Bang, 2NE1, CL, Taeyang. Her work has included choreographing routines and starring in music videos and movies. One of her notable successes was her work choreographing the music video for Justin Bieber's 2015 song "Sorry", which as of January 2020 is the 8th most viewed video on YouTube with more than 3 billion views. The video later won the "Video of the Year" award at the 2016 American Music Awards. Goebel went on to choreograph and direct all thirteen of Justin Bieber's Purpose: The Movement videos. These videos have totaled over 5.3 billion views combined as of January 2020.

Goebel and her father, who is also her manager, run The Palace Dance Studio in Auckland.

In 2012, Goebel starred on both America's Best Dance Crew and Dancing With the Stars Australia. She then worked on Jennifer Lopez's 2012 world tour and performed with her on the American Idol season 11 finale. Goebel went on to choreograph and take on a role in the American 3D dance film Step Up: All In, released on 8 August 2014.

In 2015, her choreography for DeeWunn's "Mek It Bunx Up" went viral and, as of January 2020, has received over 15 million views on YouTube.

In 2015, Goebel was the leading choreographer for New Zealand's first hip-hop feature film, Born to Dance.

In 2016, Goebel toured across Europe to multiple destinations, (Italy, France, Holland, Belgium), with her dance company The Royal Family.

In 2019, she choreographed Mylène Farmer's nine-show residency at Paris La Défense Arena in 2019. She appeared in Farmer's behind-the-scenes documentary L'Ultime Création on Amazon Prime Video. That year she also choreographed Rihanna’s Savage X Fenty Show promoting her lingerie line, which was featured in a documentary regarding the making of the show on Amazon Prime Video.

In 2020, Goebel choreographed Jennifer Lopez's and Shakira's Super Bowl halftime show.

In 2023, Goebel choreographed Rihanna's Super Bowl LVII halftime show.

Music 
On 8 August 2016 Goebel released her first music video to the song "Friday", which was then featured on her EP Vicious. Later in August 2016, she released a music video for "Nasty", which is also featured on the EP.

In December 2016 she eventually released Vicious, which featured artists including Jamaican Dancehall star, DeeWunn.

Style 
Goebel is known for her particular style, known as Polyswagg. As she describes it, her style is based on hearing, breathing and living the music, being passionate while dancing and transmitting feelings. She also draws on music inspirations from the DanceHall style. Large amounts of her routines include this element, most notably in the Royal Family's World Hip Hop Dance Championship performances.

Honours and awards 
In 2009, Goebel was awarded the Street Dance New Zealand Choreographer of the Year and Dancer of the Year awards. In 2014, she was named Female Choreographer of the Year at the World Of Dance Awards in Los Angeles.

In 2006, she was awarded the inaugural Special Recognition Award at the Creative New Zealand Arts Pasifika Awards.

In 2015, she was presented with the Top Variety Artist Award from the Variety Artists Club of New Zealand Inc and the Young Leader category of the New Zealand Women of Influence Awards.

In 2016, she won Female Choreographer of the Year and Live Performance of the Year at the World Of Dance Awards. In the same year, the advertisement that she choreographed for New Zealand Post won Worst Ad 2016 in the TVNZ Fair Go Ad Awards 

In the 2020 New Year Honours, Goebel was appointed a Member of the New Zealand Order of Merit, for services to dance.

In 2022, she received the Primetime Emmy Award for Outstanding Choreography for her work on Amazon Prime Video's Savage X Fenty: Vol. 3 by Rihanna.

Publication 
In March 2018, Goebel published her autobiography Young Queen.

World Hip-Hop Dance Championships 
Palace Dance Studios crews and their records in the annual competition.  

*Denotes disbanded crews.

References

External links 

 

1991 births
Living people
21st-century dancers
New Zealand choreographers
New Zealand female dancers
Women choreographers
New Zealand Women of Influence Award recipients
People educated at Auckland Girls' Grammar School
21st-century New Zealand people
New Zealand people of Samoan descent
New Zealand people of Scottish descent
New Zealand people of Chinese descent
New Zealand autobiographers
Women autobiographers
Members of the New Zealand Order of Merit
People from Manurewa
Primetime Emmy Award winners